Mandaui is a small island in the Philippines and part of the Lubang group of islands. The island has two "small hills of uneven height."

See also

 List of islands of the Philippines

References

Islands of Occidental Mindoro